Andrea Toniato (born 27 February 1991) is an Italian swimmer. He competed in the men's 100 metre breaststroke event at the 2016 Summer Olympics.

References

External links
 

1991 births
Living people
People from Cittadella
Italian male breaststroke swimmers
Olympic swimmers of Italy
Swimmers at the 2016 Summer Olympics
Universiade medalists in swimming
Mediterranean Games gold medalists for Italy
Mediterranean Games medalists in swimming
Swimmers at the 2013 Mediterranean Games
Swimmers at the 2018 Mediterranean Games
Universiade silver medalists for Italy
Medalists at the 2013 Summer Universiade
Medalists at the 2015 Summer Universiade
Competitors at the 2017 Summer Universiade
Sportspeople from the Province of Padua
20th-century Italian people
21st-century Italian people